Buster Bronco is the official Mascot of Western Michigan University athletic teams.  "Born" in 1981, Buster is an official member of the WMU Cheer Team.  Along with cheering at Bronco athletic events, Buster also makes appearances at community schools, hospitals, libraries and parades.

Initially Buster was a student dressed in a horse's head.  After a few changes, the current Buster Bronco took the form seen today in 1991.

See also
 List of U.S. college mascots

References

Mid-American Conference mascots
Western Michigan Broncos
Fictional horses